King Ravohimena and the Magic Grains (French: Le Roi Ravohimena ou les graines magiques) is a Malagasy folktale, first published by ethnologist Jeanne de Longchamps in 1955. It is related to the theme of the calumniated wife and is classified in the international Aarne-Thompson-Uther Index as ATU 707, "The Three Golden Children".

Sources
The tale was collected in Belu, near Tsiribihina River (West Coast of Madagascar), and published by Jeanne de Longchamps.

Translations
The tale was translated into Russian as "Андриамбахуака Равухимена и волшебные зерна" ("Andrianbahuaca Ravuhimena and the Magic Grains").

Summary
Local nobleman Ravuhimena walks about in his properties and listens to the conversations between three sisters: the eldest promises to weave a hundred braids with a single thread; the middle one that she will weave a thousand with a single thread; and the youngest promises to give birth to five sons by him after she eats five grains. Ravuhimena approaches the three girls and admires the beauty of the youngest. He then decides to marry all three sisters.

He takes them to his palace and gives the eldest and the middle sister a thread and they fail in weaving. The youngest, Refarane, is given five grains and becomes pregnant. While Ravohimena goes to war, Refarana gives birth to five children, but her sisters replace the children for oxen jowl and rags. Her sisters summon a witch and turns Refarane into an animal, and she escapes to the forest.

The children are cast in the river, but they are saved by "The Man of the Forest". Meanwhile, one of Ravohimena's slaves goes to the forest to chop firewood, when a ghostly voice stops him by saying that the slave in Ravohimena's forest. The slave tells the man of the forest about it and they go to the location of the voice. The man in the forest sees a little lemur and asks it its name. The lemur says she is Refarane.

Ravohimena comes back from war and asks his two co-wives about Refarane's whereabouts. The sisters lie that she gave birth to abominations and fled into the forest. One day, on a hunt, Ravohimena finds the five children playing in the woods in front of the Man of the Forest's hut. The king enters the hut and asks him about the children, and suspicions begin to form in his mind that they are his children.

Ravohimena visits a Mpsikidi, who confirms the story of the Man in the Forest. Ravohimena asks what he can do to save Refarane. The Mpsikidi advises him to seek a little man with long hair. The king goes to the little man with long hair, who asks him to get him first honey from red bees in a fresh plantain leaf, then to kill a white boar in the woods. Ravohimena takes on his quests, gets the honey and kills the white boar, then brings it. The little man then asks to be deloused. Ravohimena delouses him, but only finds rice grains. He fills a basket with them and the little man advises him to take the basket to the child of Ampelamananohi.

Ravohimena takes the basket to Ampelamananohi's house and places it outside to lure the creature. Ampelamananohi arrives with his son and smells the rice basket. He gets close to eat it, when Ravohimena and his men kill the father with spears and take the son with them.

Ravohimena goes to the man in the forest's hut and takes his children with them to a grand feast in their homage. During the feast, Ampelamananohi's son begins to sing a song about how three sisters promised to marry Ravohimena, each promising an extraordinary feat. Ampelamananohi's son continues to sing it, and Ravohimena asks him about Refarane. Ampelamananohi's son walks to the forest and the crows follows him. The creature stops by a tree with a little lemur on it. Ravohimena asks if the lemur is his wife Refarane. The lemur commands the tree to bend if she is indeed Refarane. The tree bends, the little lemur climbs down and turns into Refarane. Her sisters hang down their heads in shame, one of them becoming a lemur and the other a cricket.

Analysis

Tale type
The tale is classified in the international Aarne-Thompson-Uther Index as tale type ATU 707, "The Three Golden Children". Czech scholar  also recognized the tale as another variant of type ATU 707.

According to Hering's Malagasy Tale Index, the tale type is one of 78 international types found in both Madagascar and elsewhere. The collectors noted that the tale type adapted and integrated into traditions of the country, becoming "a clan legend, an explanation for uxorilocal marriage, and a cautionary tale against polygamy".

Variants
Eight variants of tale type 707 have been collected in Magadascar: two tales from the Merina, a clan tale and a tale titled Haitraitra an'olombelona, zaka an'nanahary (or Andriambahoaka sy ny zanany); two tales from the Betsileo, one titled Le mari et ses trois femmes and the other "Andriabohoemanana and the unfortunate Rafaravavy"; two tales from the Sakalava, titled "Ramikiloke" and "The speaking bird".

In a Merina tale described in the book Tantara ny Andriana eto Madagasikara ("History of the Nobles in Madagascar"), Andriambavirano came down from heaven, goddess Andriambavirano ("Princess of the Water") descends to earth in leaf form near a lake in the Angavo mountain. Andriamanjavona, "royal prince of double affiliation" and son of sovereign Andriandravindravina, is destined to take it, which he does by singing a magical charm. He captures the leaf and takes it home. The leaf becomes a woman named Andriambavirano and they marry. The "vadibe", the first wife, casts away Andriambavirano's three children (two boys and a girl), but they are saved by a foster father. Further sources state the three children (the elder boy named Rabingoanony, the younger boy Andrianjatovorovola and the girl Ratandratandravola) are saved by a creature called Konantitra and later become heroes and heroines. Professor Lee Haring noted the connection to the international tale type ATU 707, "The Three Golden Children".

French ethnologue  also analysed two similar Malagasy variants with the substitution of the children for objects and the jealous queens casting the children in the water, one of them titled Ifaranomby, published in 1955 by researcher Jeanne de Longchamps.

French orientalist Gabriel Ferrand collected a tale in Fianarantsoa, from the Betsileo with the title Le mari et ses trois femmes ("The man and his three wives"). In this tale, a man's third wife gives birth to a boy named Razafinjato and a girl called Ramitriavola. The other co-wives replace them for objects and cast them in the sea in a box. An old woman who lived in a garden saves the box and raises the twins. Years later, she directs both of them to their father. When the co-wives meet the twins, they set the boy and the girl on a quest for some jewels by the margin of the river where alligators roamed, and later to cut the tail of a dangerous bull. The brother performs these tasks, despite the danger, and leaves unscathed.

In a variant from the Sakalava, collected by Norwegian missionary  in Morondava with the title Voromivola or L'oiseau parler ("The Speaking Bird"), two sisters, Talanôlo and Reivone go to a local celebration, leaving behind their youngest sister, Refarane. However, Refarane appears at the event on a horse. The king sees her and is smitten, wanting to marry her. Refarane gives birth to two children (the older a boy) who are replaced for a cat and a little mouse, and thrown in the water. They are saved by an old woman and find a talking bird (Voromivola), who tells them the truth and helps them reconcile their family.

See also
 The Child with a Moon on his Chest (Sotho)

References 

Malagasy culture
African fairy tales
Female characters in fairy tales
Child abandonment
Adoption forms and related practices
Adoption, fostering, orphan care and displacement
ATU 700-749